A squire is a feudal follower of a knight, a lord of the manor, a member of the post-feudal landed gentry, or a modern informal appellation deriving from this.

Squire may also refer to:

People 
Squire (name)

Nickname 
Jaime Alguersuari, Spanish racing driver and DJ under the stage name Squire
George W. Ebbert (1810–1890), mountain man and early settler in the Oregon Country
Squire Gersh (born 1913), American jazz musician
Richard "Squire" Lee (1726-1795), Virginian colonist and American politician active in the American Revolutionary War
Squire Moore (1897-?), American baseball pitcher in the Negro leagues
Mick Murray (Irish republican) (c. 1936-1999) or Squire Murray, IRA Volunteer named as a ringleader of the Birmingham Pub Bombings
Dave Taylor (born 1957), English professional wrestler

Places 
Squire, West Virginia, an unincorporated community
Squire, a community in the township of Georgian Bluffs, Ontario, Canada
Squire Island, Wilhelm Archipelago, off the coast of Antarctica
Hundred of Squire, a cadastral unit in South Australia

Transportation 
Squire Car Manufacturing Company, a British auto manufacturer of the 1930s
Ford Squire, a car produced for the United Kingdom market between 1955 and 1959
Squire sidecars, a British sidecar manufacturer

Entertainment 
Squire (album), by Alan Hull
Squire (novel), by Tamora Pierce
Squire (comics), the name of three DC Comics superheroes
Squire, English Mod pop group from Woking formed in the 1970s

Other
The Squire Law Library, Cambridge, England

See also
The Squires (disambiguation)
Squires (disambiguation)
Squier, a brand of electric guitars